The Drop is a 2022 American black comedy film directed by Sarah Adina Smith, written by Smith and Joshua Leonard, and starring Anna Konkle and Jermaine Fowler. It premiered at the 2022 Tribeca Film Festival and was released on Hulu on January 13, 2023.

Plot
The film follows a young married couple, Lex and Mani, running an artisanal bakery in Los Angeles and making plans to start a family. Their plans are thrown into upheaval when, while at a tropical resort for a destination wedding, Lex accidentally drops their friend's baby.

Cast
 Anna Konkle as Lex
 Jermaine Fowler as Mani
 Jillian Bell as Lindsey
 Utkarsh Ambudkar as Robbie
 Robin Thede as Shauna
 Aparna Nancherla as Mia
 Joshua Leonard as Josh
 Jennifer Lafleur as Peggy
 Elisha Henig as Levi

Production
The script was written by Sarah Adina Smith, who also directed the film, and Joshua Leonard, who also appears in the film.  Smith and Leonard produced alongside Jonako Donley, Mel Eslyn, Shuli Harel, Tim Headington, and Lia Buman. It was executive produced by Mark Duplass and Jay Duplass. Smith said she had the idea for the story while thinking about the 2014 Swedish film Force Majeure. It was filmed in the United States and Mexico during the COVID-19 pandemic, which Smith said was a challenge.

Release
The film had its world premiere at the Tribeca Film Festival on June 11, 2022. The film was released on Hulu on January 13, 2023.

Reception
On the review aggregator website Rotten Tomatoes, the film holds an approval rating of 51% based on reviews from 39 critics, with an average rating of 5.2/10. The website's critics consensus reads, "The Drop has its finger on the pulse and a game cast trying to keep it alive, but despite its heart being in the right place, this comedy's electrocardiogram is as flat as the Great Plains." Noel Murray of the Los Angeles Times wrote that while the film "doesn't always work as a comedy, it does have the ring of hard-won truth" by demonstrating "how someone's seemingly rock-solid reputation can be undone in an instant." Christy Lemire of RogerEbert.com awarded the film 1.5 out of 4 stars, writing that despite an "intriguing premise, The Drop never reaches its full cringe comedy potential."

References

External links 
 

2022 black comedy films
2020s American films
2020s English-language films
American black comedy films
Duplass Brothers Productions films
Hulu original films